Highway 84 (MT 84) is a  east–west state highway in the U.S. State of Montana. MT 84's western terminus is at U.S. Route 287 (US 287) in the small community of Norris and the eastern terminus is at US 191 and MT 85 at Four Corners. From Four Corners, US 191 runs east to Bozeman, and south to West Yellowstone; Highway 84 travels west to Norris; and Montana Highway 85 runs north to Belgrade.  

Before receiving its current designation, Highway 84 was designated as Montana Secondary Highway 289.

Major intersections

References

 

084